"Ride" is a song written and recorded by American musical duo Twenty One Pilots, from their fourth studio album, Blurryface. "Ride" was originally released as a promotional single on YouTube on May 11, 2015. The music video for the song was released on YouTube the following day. It was serviced to US contemporary hit radio on April 16, 2016, as the album's fifth official single. The song peaked at number five on the US Billboard Hot 100.

Composition
"Ride" is an uptempo alternative rap song that lasts for a duration of three minutes and thirty-four seconds. The track combines elements of rock, hip hop, reggae, punk, electro and pop. According to the sheet music published at Musicnotes.com by Alfred Music, it written in the time signature of common time, with a fast tempo of 150 beats per minute. "Ride" is composed in the key of G-flat major, while Tyler Joseph's vocal range ranges from a low of D3 to a high of B4. The song has a basic sequence of G–Am–Em–C/D during the introduction, changes to G–Am–Em–C–G–Am–Em–Dsus2 in the sung verse, has G–Am–Em–C during the pre-chorus, follows G–Am–Em–C–G–Am–Em–Dsus2 at the refrain, changes to G–Am–Em–C–G–Am– Em–C/D in the rap verse and follows G–Am–D–Em–Am7(add4)–Em–D–D/F during the bridge as its chord progression. 
 
The musical composition has a mix of infectious parts built on a rich reggae influence infused with rock sounds. The chilled-out number instrumentally exudes an upbeat reggae vibe, being drenched deeply in Caribbean-tinged riffs and shimmery synths. Josh Dun's slow, one-two drum beat binds together the track alongside a dark, brooding bassline. His drumming provides the upbeat track with rhythmic dexterity, playing in a punk-inspired fashion. Joseph recites contemplative rhymes over electropop-oriented reggae beats. His vocal parts demonstrate a crisp delivery, one that abruptly goes from balladry to rapping to screaming. After singing an opening verse, Joseph delivers his lyrics in a hard, staccato style of fast-paced rapping. The song's chorus and his proclamations come layered between verses that bear highly rhymthic sensibilities. The track's instrumental also takes dub-inspired deviations. At its bridge, Joseph engages in call-and-response phrases. During the breakdown, he sings in a manner shifting between his regular voice and a falsetto. The song builds over time, culminating in a towering climax which has Joseph's vocals emphatically soaring. The musical arrangement closes with a piano-driven conclusion.

The lyrical content of "Ride" speaks about going with the flow and is home to idioms as well as an ominous message. Despite its upbeat atmosphere, the song harbors melancholic rumination concerning the human condition. Joseph's apprehensive lyrics address millennial angst while discussing relatable life struggles. While he tries to relax and feel confident about his accomplishments, Joseph's mind digresses on who or what he'd die for and what is truly important in life. At one point, he proclaims, "Yeah I think about the end just way too much/But it's fun to fantasize." The song's chorus has Joseph elongating its syllables and shouting his lines: "Oh, I'm falling, so I'm taking my time on my ride." He sings poignant lyrics with a hint of darkness that have him confessing, "I've been thinking too much/help me."

Critical reception
Billboards Garrett Kamps favorably compared "Ride" to the work of Jamaican sound engineer King Tubby. Gab Ginsberg, from the same publication, called the single "irresistible." Erik Leijon of Montreal Gazette described "Ride" as "impossibly catchy faux-reggae." Jason Pettigrew from Alternative Press claimed it "might be the most happiest song in TOP's songbook, and there's still an ominous message." Mitchell Hillman for Phoenix New Times remarked that the song "is pushed even further into a blissful realm by Joseph's supersonic rapping." Chelsea Deeley from Music Feeds praised the vocal parts Tyler Joseph contributed to the song, writing that it "showcases a succinct vocal delivery that can go from rapping to balladry to screaming in a heartbeat and flourish with complete satisfaction to the ears." Kerrangs Sam Law described "Ride" by saying, "Ostensibly the most upbeat track in the twenty one pilots back-catalogue... Wearing its rich reggae influence on its (short) sleeve, luxuriating in a deep well of Caribbean-kissed riffage and shimmering synth-work, it introduced newcomers to another infectious facet of their sound." Anne Nickoloff and Troy Smith for The Plain Dealer considered the single "a hodgepodge of everything the band does best." Conversely, George Palathingal for The Sydney Morning Herald claimed, "'Ride, meanwhile, proves an equal-opportunity offender to fans of dub, hip-hop and rock." Likewise, Philip Cosores from Consequence of Sound questioned, "Is this the future of rock? A little hip-hop, a little dub, a little aggravating, and a lotta catchy?" He concludes, "'Ride' represents the worst-case scenario for Twenty One Pilots — a musical cornucopia that lacks for good taste."

Commercial performance 
The song peaked at number five on the Billboard Hot 100, number one on the Hot Rock Songs, Mainstream Top 40, and Alternative Songs charts, number four on the Adult Top 40 chart and number five on the Hot Dance Airplay chart. The former ranking, coupled with "Heathens" positioned at number four, made Twenty One Pilots the third rock act with simultaneous top five Hot 100 singles in the chart's 58-year history, following only the Beatles and Elvis Presley, making them the first act in 47 years to achieve this milestone. It is the duo's third highest ranking single to date, behind "Stressed Out" and "Heathens". "Ride" has also reached the top 20 in various other countries, including Australia, Canada, Slovakia and France.

As of December 2016, "Ride" has sold over 1.2 million copies in the US.

Music video 
The music video for "Ride" demonstrates a stark contrast of a performance within a forest, abruptly transitioning from the dark to daylight. It showcases Tyler Joseph playing bass guitar wearing white-rimmed sunglasses while Josh Dun performs on drums. The white-rimmed pair of sunglasses seen in the video for "Ride" have since become part of Joseph's signature attire. The video, as of April 2022, has over 1.25 billion views on YouTube.

Reception
Rachel Campell from Alternative Press commented, "While this track instrumentally gives off an upbeat, reggae vibe, the video for it is anything but, showing a stark contrast of a forest performance in the dark and in daylight. The one unique thing about it is Joseph plays bass, a talent minimally showcased in their live performances as he normally runs, crashes and dances across the stage while Josh Dun holds it down on the drums." Writing for the same publication, Jessica Bridgeman complimented Joseph's stylish fashion sense, saying, "Who needs boring Aviators when you can step out in some statement shades, à la Tyler?" The music video for the single "Ride" has since surpassed a billion views on YouTube. Although this is not the first time Twenty One Pilots have achieved such a feat, it still remains an uncommon figure for rock and metal bands to reach. In modern times, only the band Linkin Park alongside the duo's videos for "Heathens" and "Stressed Out" have experienced similar success and broken the barrier.

Live performances
Twenty One Pilots performed "Ride" during a concert held at Comerica Theatre in Downtown Phoenix, Arizona. For the performance, Tyler Joseph picked up and played a bass guitar. Their rendition close with Josh Dun's drum kit being brought into the pit while a crowd of fans kept him afloat.  

With the lower half of their faces half-covered in balaclava, Twenty One Pilots provided a live performance of "Ride" during a concert at UNSW Roundhouse in Sydney, Australia on April 20, 2016.

They performed the song an at the Forum in Inglewood, California during their Emotional Roadshow World Tour. After drummer Josh Dun played a cover version of "My Heart Will Go On" by Céline Dion on trumpet, the duo segued into a performance of "Ride." It was accompanied by a visual set change, with the stage suddenly becoming crowded by nine additional musicians from their two opening acts as Dun played drums on a platform held afloat by fans in the pit. While still on the tour the duo provided a live rendition at the Honda Center in Anaheim on February 15, 2017. The concert was a spectacle, featuring two stages and a giant hamster ball.

The band provided a live rendition of "Ride" during a concert at Bell Centre on May 22, 2019. After starting their show with a performance of "Holding on to You," they segued into a live rendition "Ride." The audience participated in a singalong during their performance.

Usage in media
The song appears on the soundtracks for the video games WWE 2K17 and Pro Evolution Soccer 2017.

Track listing

Personnel
Twenty One Pilots
 Tyler Joseph – vocals, bass guitar, piano, keyboards, guitar, organ, programming, synthesizers
 Josh Dun – drums, percussion
Additional musicians
 Ricky Reed – bass, programming, backing vocals

Charts

Weekly charts

Year-end charts

Decade-end charts

Certifications

Release history

See also
List of Hot Rock & Alternative Songs number ones
List of Billboard Mainstream Top 40 number-one songs of 2016

References

External links

2015 singles
2015 songs
American reggae songs
Reggae fusion songs
American pop punk songs
American hip hop songs
Fueled by Ramen singles
Songs written by Tyler Joseph
Twenty One Pilots songs